Haageocereus australis, commonly known as 'Quisco De La Costa De Aric', is a species of cactus endemic to southern Peru and northern Chile. Flower color is white. It is hardy to USDA Zone 10b and grows in a very dry desert. The  stems grow along the ground and may reach  in length.

References

The Cactus Family  by Edward F. Anderson, Wilhelm Barthlott, Roger Brown

australis
Cacti of South America
Flora of Chile
Flora of Peru